Morgan Fox is the name of:

Morgan Fox (model) (born 1970), Canadian model

Morgan Fox (footballer) (born 1993), Welsh footballer
Morgan Fox (American football), American football player